Events from the year 1860 in art.

Events
 February 28 – The Artists Rifles is established as a volunteer corps of the British Army with headquarters at Burlington House in London.
 May 23 – Dante Gabriel Rossetti marries his model Elizabeth Siddal in Hastings and they depart on honeymoon to Paris.
 December 30 – Towarzystwo Zachęty do Sztuk Pięknych ("Society for the Encouragement of Fine Arts") holds its first meeting in Warsaw.
 Founding of the Montreal Museum of Fine Arts.

Awards
 Grand Prix de Rome, painting: Ernest Michel
 Grand Prix de Rome, sculpture: Barthélemy Raymond
 Grand Prix de Rome, architecture: Joseph Louis Achille Joyau
 Grand Prix de Rome, music: Emile Paladilhe

Works

 Lawrence Alma-Tadema – A Bargain: Brabant Women
 Paul-Jacques-Aimé Baudry – Charlotte Corday
 Edward Burne-Jones – Clara von Bork and Sidonia von Bork
 Paul Cézanne - The Four Seasons
 Edgar Degas – Young Spartans Exercising (begun about this date)
 William Dyce
 The Man of Sorrows
 Pegwell Bay, Kent – a Recollection of October 5th 1858
 Francesco Hayez
 Massimo d'Azeglio
 Self-portrait at the age of 69
 Hiroshige II – Iwatake mushroom gathering at Kumano in Kishū
 William Holman Hunt – The Finding of the Saviour in the Temple
 Daniel Huntington – Chocorua Peak, New Hampshire
 Friedrich Kaulbach – Elisabet Ney
 Édouard Manet
 Portrait of M. and Mme. Auguste Manet (Musée d'Orsay, Paris)
 The Spanish Singer (Metropolitan Museum of Art, New York)
 John Everett Millais – The Black Brunswicker
 Clark Mills – Equestrian statue of George Washington, Washington, D.C.
 William Bell Scott – Ailsa Craig
 Rebecca Solomon – Peg Woffington's Visit to Triplet
 Simeon Solomon – The Mother of Moses
 John Roddam Spencer Stanhope – Robin of Modern Times
 G. F. Watts – Alice Prinsep
 Canova Lions (bronze castings)

Births
 January 1 
John Cassidy, Irish sculptor and painter (died 1939)
Jan Vilímek, Czech illustrator and painter (died 1938)
 January 29 – William Jacob Baer, American miniature painter (died 1941)
 February 21 - Goscombe John, Welsh sculptor (died 1952)
 February 27 – Vardges Sureniants, Armenian painter (died 1921)
 April 6 – René Lalique, French glass designer (died 1945)
 May 30 – Archibald Thorburn, Scottish-born wildlife painter (died 1935)
 May 31 – Walter Sickert, English Impressionist painter (died 1942)
 June 1 – Hugh Thomson, Irish-born illustrator (died 1920)
 June 18 
George Frampton, English sculptor (died 1928)
Laura Muntz Lyall, Canadian Impressionist painter (died 1930)
 June 25 – Sutherland Macdonald, English tattoo artist (died 1942)
 August 5 – Louis Wain, English cat portrait painter (died 1942)
 August 18 – Iso Rae, Australian Impressionist painter (died 1940)
 September 7 – Grandma Moses (born Anna Mary Robertson), American folk artist (died 1961)
 September 16 – Solomon Joseph Solomon, English portrait painter (died 1927)
 September 30 – Vincenzo Irolli, Italian painter (died 1949)
 October 4 – Sidney Paget, British illustrator (died 1908)
 date unknown – Iris Nampeyo, Hopi potter and ceramic artist (died 1942)

Deaths
 January 20 – William Charles Ross, British painter of historical paintings, miniatures and portraits (born 1794)
 February 16 – Denis Auguste Marie Raffet, illustrator and lithographer (born 1804)
 March 28 – Jean-Pierre Franque, French historical subjects and portraiture painter (born 1774)
 April 28 – Jakob Guttmann, sculptor (born 1811)
 June 15 – Juan Antonio Ribera, Spanish Neoclassical historical painter (born 1779)
 June 20 – Joseph Willibrord Mähler, German portrait painter (born 1778)
 August 22 – Alexandre-Gabriel Decamps, painter (born 1803)
 September 21 – Antoine Maurin, French lithographer (born 1793)
 October 2 – Louis Hersent, French painter (born 1777)
 October 3
Alfred Edward Chalon, Swiss portrait painter (born 1780)
Rembrandt Peale, American artist (born 1778)
 date unknown
 Julien-Honoré-Germain d'Aubuisson, French portrait and miniature painter (born 1786)
 Dai Xi, Chinese painter of the 19th century and representative of the academic manner (born 1801)
 Louis Stanislas Marin-Lavigne, French painter and lithographer (born 1797)
 Ernestine Panckoucke, French botanical illustrator and flower painter (born 1784)

References

 
Years of the 19th century in art
1860s in art